Eupithecia convallata is a moth in the family Geometridae. It is found in Afghanistan and Iran.

Subspecies
Eupithecia convallata convallata (Iran)
Eupithecia convallata terricolor Vojnits, 1988 (Afghanistan)

References

Moths described in 1938
convallata
Moths of the Middle East